The Triangle Adventure Playground is an Adventure playground that has operated in Oval, in south London since 1957. It is the oldest adventure playground in London that is still located on its original site.

History
The Triangle Adventure Playground was established in 1957 by Marjorie Porter (1907-2009),  Marjory Allen, and the London Council. Unlike many other adventure playgrounds established following the Second World War, the Triangle Adventure Playground was never a bombsite. It was established on land set aside for the Ashmole Primary School, which had been cleared as part of a program of 'slum clearance'.

The playground is staffed by playworkers.

Notes

References

External links

Playgrounds
Adventure playgrounds